"The Man from G.R.A.M.P.A." is the 21st and penultimate episode of the thirty-second season of the American animated television series The Simpsons, and the 705th episode overall. It aired in the United States on Fox on May 16, 2021. The episode was directed by Mike Frank Polcino, and written by Carolyn Omine. In this episode, Homer meets a British secret agent.

Plot
In 1970, Head of the British Intelligence Agency, Terrance, is sent to America after a Russian spy named "the grey fox". 50 years pass, and Terrance has finally found a clue of where the grey fox is, which is in Springfield retirement home. After posing as the residence's new resident, he meets Homer and his friends at Moe's bar and bonds with them by telling them about his past life, and how his father was an oafish fool who screwed up every mission he was on, making a laughing stock of his reputation.

Later, Terrance begins to suspect that Homer's father Abe may be the grey fox and interrogates Homer. Homer realizes that Abe may be the grey fox after Terrance reveals that Homer somehow keeps his job even though he screws it up all the time, and that Abe hates America.

The two then spy on Abe, and see him take a package from two Russian-looking men. Terrance asks Homer to trick Abe into Terrance's company. However, Homer cannot bring himself to bring Abe in, so Terrance (having now gone insane) kidnaps both Homer and Abe at gunpoint and plans to execute them both in the desert. Meanwhile Marge, Bart, and Lisa go to the retirement home to find Abe and Homer. They meet Terrance's daughter, who tells them that Terrance has kidnapped them. The family head to the desert with Chief Wiggum and arrest Terrance.

Abe feels sorry for Terrance and his failure to accomplish anything in his entire life, and pretends to be the grey fox, making Terrance feel proud. Later, Homer and Lisa hear a Russian voice in Maggie's room and believe she may be in communication with the Russians, but they learn that the voice is coming from her Russian-made toy.

Reception

Critical reception
Tony Sokol of Den of Geek gave the episode 3.5 stars out of 5, stating "“The Man from G.R.A.M.P.A.” feels like the kind of movie Homer would fall asleep at. The British spy film references come too respectfully, and the laughs have to squeeze through too stiff an upper lip. It’s not that it’s too clever, as opposed to funny, which has plagued some episodes. It pulls its punchlines when they should be hot enough to cut 007 to a size .035."

Jesse Bereta from bubbleblabber.com gave the episode a 7/10, stating “Unfortunately, there is not much excitement going on for an episode that should be action-packed. Once the story gets rolling, it is more about convincing Homer that his father is a spy more than any actual spy work. It would have been fun to see this long-running series try to inject some action like we would not usually see. They managed to accomplish some great stuff back when Hank Scorpio came to Springfield. Regardless, it was a fun episode that tried something different. Sure, we have seen plenty of Grampa Simpson’s old war days, but not much after that, aside from raising Homer. Alternatively, there was much room throughout this story to expand or do something unexpected. Unfortunately, the episode follows much of the same formula you would expect. Though it is a pleasing addition to a diverse season 32.”

References

External links
 

The Simpsons (season 32) episodes
2021 American television episodes